Satyanath Borah (1860–1925) was an Assamese grammarian, essayist and music composer. He write sometimes in the pen name of Ejon Asomiya. Bora participated in India's freedom struggle and also associated with the Jonaki and Usha magazine. He is the author of Gitabali, a book consisting of 28 modern Assamese song. Other literacy works of Bora are Sarathi (The Guide, 1915), Kendra Sabha (1925), Chintakoli (Buds of thought, 1935) and Akash-rahasya, Jivanar omiya, His grammatical works include Bohol Byakoron, a book on the Assamese grammar.

See also
 Assamese literature
 History of Assamese literature
 List of Assamese-language poets
 List of Assamese writers with their pen names

References

External links
 Books at Open Library.
 Sarathi at tirbhumi.com.

Writers from Guwahati
1860 births
1925 deaths
People from Kamrup Metropolitan district
19th-century Indian linguists
20th-century Indian linguists
Assamese-language writers